The Nepal Magazine is a weekly national magazine published by Kantipur Media Group in Kathmandu, which also publishes Kantipur and The Kathmandu Post. The magazine focuses on national socio-political matters of Nepal, with satirical pieces on current affairs and trends of the country, along with lighter stories of lifestyle and arts. Nepal has the country's largest circulation for a weekly news-magazine, according to the official data released by Press Council Nepal in 2016. Basanta Basnet is the Editor.

History 
Nepal Magazine was established in 2000 as a fortnightly magazine. It has been covering political issues along with photo story, movie review, celebrity gossips and literature. Its two notable annual publication are Plus 2 College Ranking and Person of the year. Nepal is generally regarded as leading and influential nepali magazines, along with Himal Khabarpatrika.

Editors 
The magazine has been under five editors so far, Vijay Kumar Pandey, Tirtha Koirala,  Kishor Nepal, Prashant Aryal, Sudheer Sharma, Narayan Wagle and currently Basanta Basnet [Editor].

Notable staff and columnists (past and present) 
 Abhi Subedi
 Rabindra Mishra
 Khagendra Sangraula
 Leela Mani Paudyal
 Madhab Basnet
 Ram Bahadur Rawal
 Prashant Aryal

References

External links 
 
 Kantipur Publications

Weekly magazines
Newspapers published in Nepal
2000 establishments in Nepal